Josh Bauer may refer to:

 Josh Bauer (24), a character from the TV series 24
 Josh Bauer (soccer) (born 1998), American soccer player